Great Expectations is the debut album by English singer-songwriter Tasmin Archer, released in late 1992 on EMI Records. The first single released from the album, "Sleeping Satellite", went to number one both in the UK and Ireland, while sitting just outside the top 10 in Germany (No. 12). Three more UK singles were released from the album in the wake of Archer's initial success: "In Your Care" (UK No. 16), "Lords of the New Church" (UK No. 26) and "Arienne" (UK No. 30).

The album was later released in the United States on Capitol Records, and was mildly successful due to the single "Sleeping Satellite", which peaked at number 32 on the Billboard Hot 100. The album itself reached a peak of number 115 in the US. The single and album fared better in other parts of the world, however, such as Australia (single reached No. 14; album peaked at 56).

Critical reception
Nancy Culp from NME wrote, "Tasmin is something of a vocal find, her strong, pure tones can imbue even the limpest tune with pathos. It's when she lets rip with the ballads that she really shines."

Track listing

Personnel

Musicians
Tasmin Archer – vocals
Tessa Niles, Carol Kenyon – backing vocals
John Hughes – guitars, keyboards
Peter Kaye – guitars, Fairlight programming
Steve Blades, Robbie McIntosh, Phil Palmer, Elliott Randall, Tony Wimshurst – guitars
John Beck – keyboards
Paul Wickens – keyboards, accordion
Gary Maughn – Fairlight programming
Danny Thompson – double bass
Charlie Morgan – Drums

Production
Tracks 1, 4, 5, and 11 produced by Julian Mendelsohn & Paul "Wix" Wickens
Tracks 2, 3, 6, 7, 8 and 9 produced by Julian Mendelsohn & Peter Kaye
Track 10 produced by John Hughes and Steve Fitzmaurice
All songs recorded by Steve Fitzmaurice except tracks 4, 5, and 11 (recorded by Julian Mendelsohn).
Mixed by Julian Mendelsohn

Charts

Weekly charts

Year-end charts

Certifications

References

1992 debut albums
Tasmin Archer albums
EMI Records albums
Capitol Records albums
Albums produced by Julian Mendelsohn